Chemokine (C-C motif) ligand 20 (CCL20) or liver activation regulated chemokine (LARC) or Macrophage Inflammatory Protein-3 (MIP3A)  is a small cytokine belonging to the CC chemokine family.  It is strongly chemotactic for lymphocytes and weakly attracts neutrophils. CCL20 is implicated in the formation and function of mucosal lymphoid tissues via chemoattraction of lymphocytes and dendritic cells towards the epithelial cells surrounding these tissues.  CCL20 elicits its effects on its target cells by binding and activating the chemokine receptor CCR6.

Gene expression of CCL20 can be induced by microbial factors such as lipopolysaccharide (LPS), and inflammatory cytokines such as tumor necrosis factor and interferon-γ, and down-regulated by IL-10. CCL20 is expressed in several tissues with highest expression observed in peripheral blood lymphocytes, lymph nodes, liver, appendix, and fetal lung and lower levels in thymus, testis, prostate and gut. The gene for CCL20 (scya20) is located on chromosome 2 in humans.

Recent research  in an animal model of multiple sclerosis known as experimental autoimmune encephalitis (EAE) demonstrated that regional neural activation can create "gates" for pathogenic CD4+ T cells to enter the CNS by increasing CCL20 expression, especially at L5. Sensory nerve stimulation, elicited by using muscles in the leg or electrical stimulation as in Arima et al., 2012, activates sympathetic neurons whose axons run through the dorsal root ganglia containing cell bodies of the stimulated afferent sensory nerve. Sympathetic neuronal activity activates IL-6 amplifier resulting in increased regional CCL20 expression and subsequent pathogenic CD4+ T cell accumulation at the same spinal cord level. CCL20 expression was observed to be dependent on IL-6 amplifier activation, which is dependent on NF-κB and STAT3 activation. This research provides evidence for a critical role for CCL20 in autoimmune pathogenesis of the central nervous system.

References

Further reading

External links
 

Cytokines